Quinton Jefferson (born March 31, 1993) is an American football defensive end who is a free agent. He was drafted by the Seahawks in the fifth round of the 2016 NFL Draft. He played college football at Maryland. He played for the Seahawks from 2016 to 2019, as well as, brief stints for the Los Angeles Rams, Buffalo Bills, and Las Vegas Raiders

Early years
Quinton Jefferson was born to Larry and Bahiyyah Jefferson in Pittsburgh, Pennsylvania. Jefferson attended Woodland Hills High School in Pittsburgh, Pennsylvania, where he played both football and basketball.

College career
Jefferson verbally committed to Maryland on January 24, 2011 and signed on February 2. Jefferson played all four years with the Terrapins, playing in 37 games over that span.

Professional career

Seattle Seahawks
Jefferson was drafted in the fifth round of the 2016 NFL Draft with the 147th overall selection by the Seattle Seahawks after the team swapped seventh round picks with the New England Patriots while giving them a fourth round pick in the 2017 NFL Draft in order to move up to #147 in order to select Jefferson. On May 6, 2016, the Seahawks announced that they had signed Jefferson to his rookie contract. He was placed on injured reserve on October 25, 2016, after suffering a knee injury.

On September 2, 2017, Jefferson was waived by the Seahawks.

Los Angeles Rams
On September 3, 2017, Jefferson was claimed off waivers by the Los Angeles Rams. He was waived on September 12, 2017 and was re-signed to the practice squad.

Seattle Seahawks (second stint)
On October 2, 2017, Jefferson was signed by the Seahawks off the Rams' practice squad. In Week 14 of the 2017 season, Jefferson was ejected for being involved in a scuffle with some players on the Jacksonville Jaguars. As he was leaving the field, some Jacksonville fans threw drinks at him. Jefferson attempted to climb into the stands in an effort to attack the fans, but was restrained by a team official.

In Week 1 of the 2019 season against the Cincinnati Bengals, Jefferson recorded six tackles and sacked Andy Dalton twice in the 21-20 win.

Buffalo Bills
On March 26, 2020, Jefferson signed a two-year contract with the Buffalo Bills. In Week 4 against the Las Vegas Raiders, Jefferson recorded his first career forced fumble, a strip sack on Derek Carr which he recovered himself, during the 30–23 win.

Jefferson was released by the Bills after the season on March 10, 2021.

Las Vegas Raiders
Jefferson signed with the Las Vegas Raiders on a one-year deal on March 17, 2021.

Seattle Seahawks (third stint)
Jefferson signed with the Seahawks on March 21, 2022. He played in 17 games with three starts, recording 29 tackles, two passes defensed, and a career-high 5.5 sacks.

On March 14, 2023, Jefferson was released by the Seahawks.

Statistics
Source: NFL.com

Personal life
Jefferson graduated in December 2015 from the University of Maryland with a degree in family science.

Jefferson is married to Nadia Jefferson and has four children. The oldest three children are daughters, with the youngest two girls being twins, and the youngest child is a boy.

References

External links
Seattle Seahawks bio
Maryland Terrapins bio

1993 births
Living people
American football defensive tackles
Players of American football from Pittsburgh
Maryland Terrapins football players
Seattle Seahawks players
Los Angeles Rams players
Buffalo Bills players
Las Vegas Raiders players